Bokermann's casque-headed frog (Nyctimantis bokermanni) is a species of frog in the family Hylidae.
It is endemic to Brazil, known only from Juréia-Itatins Ecological Station, another location 10 km away and Rio Verde.
Its natural habitats are subtropical or tropical moist lowland forests.

References

Endemic fauna of Brazil
Amphibians of Brazil
Amphibians described in 1993
Taxonomy articles created by Polbot